Sadler's Wells Theatre is a performing arts venue in Clerkenwell, London, England located on Rosebery Avenue next to New River Head. The present-day theatre is the sixth on the site since 1683. It consists of two performance spaces: a 1,500-seat main auditorium and the Lilian Baylis Studio, with extensive rehearsal rooms and technical facilities also housed within the site. Sadler's Wells is renowned as one of the world's leading dance venues. As well as a stage for visiting companies, the theatre is also a producing house, with a number of associated artists and companies that produce original works for the theatre. Sadler's Wells is also responsible for the management of the Peacock Theatre in the West End, during times not used by the London School of Economics.

History

First theatre and pleasure gardens

Richard Sadler opened a "Musick House" in 1683, the second public theatre newly opened in London after the Restoration, the first being the Theatre Royal, Drury Lane. The first entertainments we see at this new building are vocal and instrumental concerts. The name Sadler's Wells originates from his name and the rediscovery of monastic springs, which previously served St John's Priory Clerkenwell, on his property. This storied part of Sadler's career began around 1683 when two men were digging on his property after being advised to move gravel for the construction of a garden. They eventually struck something that they assumed to be buried treasure, but turned out to be a well. The iron-rich water was thought to provide health benefits. As such, Sadler claimed that drinking the water from the wells would be effective against "dropsy, jaundice, scurvy, green sickness and other distempers to which females are liable—ulcers, fits of the mother, virgin's fever and hypochondriacal distemper."

In 1698 Thomas Guidott, a doctor of physick who popularised the waters of Bath, wrote what he called "A true and exact account of Sadlers Well, or, The new mineral-waters lately found out at Islington treating of its nature and virtues: together with an enumeration of the chiefest diseases which it is good for, and against which it may be used, and the manner and order of taking of it." In modern times the theatre continued to serve the chalybeate water and use it for air conditioning.

This brought the health-giving properties of the mineral waters to national attention and an aristocratic clientele was soon attracted from round the country. Thus, this still quite rural location became famous for both water and for music, but as more wells were dug and the exclusiveness of Sadler's Wells declined, so did the quality of the entertainment provided—along with the quality of the clientele who were described as "vermin trained up to the gallows" by a contemporary, while, by 1711, Sadler's Wells was characterised as "a nursery of debauchery."

By the mid-18th century, the existence of two "Theatres Royal"—in Covent Garden and Drury Lane—severely limited the ability of other London theatres to perform any drama combined with music, and Sadler's Wells continued its downward spiral.

Second and third theatres
Since the Theatres Royal confined themselves to operating during the autumn and winter, Sadler's Wells filled the gap in the entertainment market with its summer season, traditionally launched on Easter Monday. Thomas Rosoman, manager from 1746 to 1771, established the Wells's pedigree for opera production and oversaw the construction of a new stone theatre, in just seven weeks—at a cost of £4,225; it opened in April 1765.

Charles Dibdin, a shareholder and manager of Sadler's Wells, took the regular nineteenth century styled proscenium theatre space and turned it into something new that audiences would flock to. The entirety of the stage was replaced with a permanent tank filled with water, and a second tank located on the roof that created a waterfall trickling down the backdrop of scenes when needed.

Designer Thomas King carefully planned and installed a water tank that covered the entirety of the stage. Due to the close proximity to the New River, water was pumped into the venue's tank using an Archimedes wheel. Traditionally used to move water from low-lying areas to higher lying areas for irrigation, it seemed to be a perfect solution to transport the water from the river to the stage tank. This technology was made effective by the use of a hand crank and tremendous physical strength. Typically a crew of 12 to 14 men worked for about a half-day to fill the tank. Although regularly filled and drained, the tanks required constant maintenance and were often filthy. More often than not, audience members were seen jumping off the balconies and into the water in order to confirm the water was real. Some aquatic drama venues featured large waterfalls, pulling water from the tank and circulating it back in order to create the appearance of cascading water of the first records of a water tank used in entertainment venues was recorded in 1794. Each theatre company produced about three substantial shows per season. Derek Forbes highlighted the use of "water-boys" that were tasked with executing scenery switches, operating large props such as chariots and battleships, and controlled the operation of the waterfall, making waves when necessary.

In the latter half of the 18th century the theatre presented a wide variety of productions. There were patriotic plays and pageants such as "A Fig for the French", which was produced to boost national morale after a heavy British defeat in a sea battle off Grenada at the hands of the French and Spanish fleets. A stirring spectacle reflecting the Fall of the Bastille won from the previously hostile Public Advertiser newspaper the enthusiastic review: "...finer scenes of greater effect have not been produced at any Theatre for many years".
 The community loved experiencing live interpretations of the battles they have been hearing news about. To produce the spectacle, ships were built exactly to scale of an inch to a foot in comparison to the Naval ships in the war. The precise detail work used in producing the set pieces was so pristine that they had the exact rigging systems and mechanisms that the ships in battle had. Craftsman that made the original ships were brought in throughout the process. Over 115 ships were on stage with guns, canons, and children actors.
During the early years of the 19th century, many famous actors appeared at the theatre, including Edmund Kean, as well as popular comedians such as Joseph Grimaldi who for all his gifts as a dramatic actor, is best remembered as the creator of "Joey the Clown" complete with the rouge half-moons on either cheek. However, the period was characterised by much public drunkenness and loutish behaviour, and the rural location prompted the management to provide escorts for patrons after dark to conduct them into central London.

With the construction of a large tank, flooded from the nearby New River, an Aquatic Theatre was used to stage extravagant naval melodramas, such as The Siege of Gibraltar. Special effects like burning volcanoes and fireworks were often used on stage because they reflected well off the water's glossy surface. Sea creatures were often a focal point and excited rowdy audiences who were seeking a show where they could let loose and enjoy a few beers in the process. These shows were extremely popular until they started to decline around 1818 due to the rising popularity of pony races. For around 25 years, these aqueous spectacles served as a leading form of theatre performance that offered a unique opportunity to see the sea in 19th Century London. The theatre also presented successful adaptations of popular novels of the time, such as A Christmas Carol and The Old Curiosity Shop, which ran during January 1841.

Just as Sadler's Wells seemed at its lowest ebb, an unexpected champion arrived in the shape of the actor-manager Samuel Phelps. His advent coincided with the passing of the Theatres Act 1843 which broke the duopoly in drama of the Theatres Royal and so Phelps, with scene painter T. L. Greenwood and leading lady Mrs Mary Warner, was able to introduce a programme of Shakespeare to the Wells. His productions (from 1844 to 1862), notably of Macbeth (1844), Antony and Cleopatra (1849) and Pericles (1854), were much admired. The well-known actress Isabella Glyn made her first notable appearance as Lady Macbeth on this stage. Phelps was followed between 1863 and 1869 by lessee Robert Edgar and his wife, actress Alice Marriott, who continued the same programme alongside contemporary plays. In 1870 the lessee and manager was the actor William Henry Pennington, a former soldier.

In latter part of the 19th century the pendulum swung back to melodrama by the 1860s. This period of the theatre's history is affectionately depicted in Pinero's play Trelawny of the 'Wells' (1898), which portrays Sadler's Wells as outmoded by the new fashion for realism. The era of aqua drama ended as fast as it seemingly began as audience members began to move onto new fascinating ideas for entertainment. This shift can possibly be attributed to the fact that scenery and props were routinely being reused which seemed to bore the audience, but it is also thought that contributions of the war took away from the stories that this type of melodrama told. At the beginning of this change in time, these full-length plays were considered to be a real-life example of combat which was an interesting cultural experience for unaffiliated audience members, yet as the war continued, audience members became more sensitive towards the topic and often shied away from it. Although typically meant to be serious, some plays were wrongly interpreted as poking fun and overly dramatising the war therefore being insensitive towards those who were actually fighting. Even though it is unclear when these aquatic performances ended, there is evidence that one of the final uses of these massive water tanks took place in 1824. Shortly after that, no further records of the famed genre exist. By 1875, plans to turn it into a bath house were proposed and, for a while, the new craze of roller skating was catered to, as the theatre was converted into a roller-skating rink and later a prize fight arena. The theatre was condemned as a dangerous structure in 1878.

Fourth theatre

After re-opening as a theatre in 1879, it became a music hall and featured performers including Marie Lloyd and Harry Champion. Roy Redgrave, founder of the theatrical dynasty also appeared there. Alice Marriott returned to manage the theatre from 1881 to around 1889.

In 1896, the theatre was converted into a cinema. Patrons were amazed by the moving pictures of the Theatregraph with film of Persimmon winning The Derby and a saucy vignette entitled "The Soldier and His Sweetheart Spooning on a Seat".

After a succession of managements in the 20th century, the theatre became increasingly run-down and closed in 1915.

Fifth theatre

By 1925 the proprietor of the Old Vic theatre, Lilian Baylis felt that her opera and drama productions needed to expand. In that year, she invited the Duke of Devonshire to make a public appeal for funds to set up a charitable foundation to buy Sadler's Wells for the nation. The appeal committee included such diverse and influential figures as Winston Churchill, Stanley Baldwin, G. K. Chesterton, John Galsworthy, Dame Ethel Smyth and Sir Thomas Beecham. It was not long before enough money had been amassed to buy the freehold.

Also in 1925, Baylis began collaborating with the ballet teacher Ninette de Valois, a former dancer with Sergei Diaghilev's Ballets Russes. At the time, de Valois was teaching in her own dance school, the Academy of Choreographic Art, but had contacted Baylis with a proposal to form a repertory ballet company and school. So in 1931 when Sadler's Wells was reopened, de Valois was allocated rehearsal rooms in the theatre and established the Sadler's Wells Ballet School and the Vic-Wells Ballet. The ballet company performed at both the Sadler's Wells and Old Vic theatres. The company grew as the school trained new dancers to join the company. The first principal dancers of the Vic-Wells ballet were Alicia Markova and Anton Dolin and the founder choreographer was Frederick Ashton, all three having been working with the Ballet Club of Marie Rambert.

Designed by F. G. M. Chancellor of Matcham & Co, the new theatre opened on 6 January 1931 with a production of Twelfth Night and a cast headed by Ralph Richardson as Sir Toby Belch and John Gielgud as Malvolio. At the beginning of Baylis's management of Sadler's Wells, it was intended that the two theatres should each offer alternating programmes of drama and opera. This happened for a short while, but it soon became clear that it was not only impractical, but also made dubious commercial sense: drama flourished at the Old Vic but lagged behind opera and dance in popularity at the Wells. The Vic-Wells Opera Company was the name of the opera company performing at Sadler's Wells. By 1933/34 season the drama company under Tyrone Guthrie included a range of acting talent including Charles Laughton, Peggy Ashcroft, Flora Robson, Athene Seyler, Marius Goring and James Mason.

From 1940, while the theatre was closed during the Second World War, the ballet company toured throughout the country, and on its return changed its name to the Sadler's Wells Ballet. Similarly, the opera company toured to return as Sadler's Wells Opera Company, and it reopened the theatre with the premiere of Benjamin Britten's Peter Grimes.

In 1946, with the re-opening of the Royal Opera House at Covent Garden, the ballet company was invited to become the resident company there. De Valois decided that a second company was needed to continue ballet performances at Sadler's Wells, and so the Sadler's Wells Theatre Ballet was formed, with John Field as artistic director. The Sadler's Wells company later relocated to Covent Garden, where it was incorporated into the Royal Ballet's charter in 1956, becoming The Royal Ballet Touring Company. After a number of years as a touring group, it returned to Sadler's Wells in 1976, becoming the Sadler's Wells Royal Ballet. In 1987, the Birmingham Hippodrome and Birmingham City Council invited Sadler's Wells Royal Ballet to re-locate to Birmingham. It did so in 1990 and changed its name to Birmingham Royal Ballet. Since the departure of the company, there has not been a resident ballet company at Sadler's Wells.

The opera company moved out of Sadler's Wells Theatre to the London Coliseum in 1968 and was later renamed English National Opera. Sadler's Wells Theatre then became a temporary home both for foreign companies and those within the UK looking for a metropolitan shop-window. In addition, Sadler's Wells, strategically near but not in the West End, was seen as the ideal launching pad for artists at the outset of their careers. Throughout the 1970s a rich diversity of attractions appeared at Sadler's Wells, recapturing something of its former eclecticism. Productions ranged from Handel Opera to the Black Theatre of Prague, to the Netherlands Dance Theatre with its controversial nudity. Also appearing during this period were Merce Cunningham, Marcel Marceau, the Kabuki Theatre, the Dance Theatre of Harlem and the Kodo Drummers from Japan. A disadvantage of such a diverse programme was that it prevented the theatre from having a consistent public image.

Briefly in the 1980s, the theatre established the New Sadler's Wells Opera company to play Gilbert and Sullivan and other light opera. The company had some success for a few years and made several respected recordings, and then severed its relationship with the theatre around 1986 and became a touring company. It finally went out of business in 1989.

The first performances of Matthew Bourne's Swan Lake—which uniquely included an all-male cast of swans—took place in the main house in November 1995, before embarking on a UK tour then playing in the West End.

The Lilian Baylis Theatre opened in October 1988 and it appeared that a permanent theatre company might emerge, but this was limited by funding difficulties.

In 1994 Ian Albery became chief executive of Sadler's Wells and presided over the planning and eventual rebuilding of the theatre. On 30 June 1996, the last performance was given at the old theatre before the bulldozers moved in. On St. Valentine's Day the following February a more unusual ceremony took place when Albery buried a time capsule under the centre stalls of the new building.

Sixth theatre
The current theatre opened on 11 October 1998 with a performance by Rambert Dance Company of Iolanthe with sets designed by Derek Jarman and Laurence Bennett. The £54 million project was one of the first projects to receive funding from the National Lottery—which contributed £42 million. The new design gave a stage which was wider and deeper and able to accommodate much larger companies and productions than the one it replaced. A new layout to the auditorium accommodated more seats. An extension at the side of the building provided a new ticket office and foyers rising to the full height of the theatre, provided easier audience access to all levels and included bars, cafes and exhibition spaces. As well as the 1,500-seat main auditorium, Sadler's Wells also has a base at the Peacock Theatre near the Aldwych in central London. The rebuilt Sadler's Wells retains the Grade II listing applied to the former theatre in 1950. It also retains access to the remains of the historic wells that still lie beneath the theatre. The architect was Aedas RHWL, the acoustic consultant was Arup Acoustics.

Pete Townshend performed there, on 26 February 2000, and recorded the concert, for the Lifehouse Chronicles box set.

In 2001, Sadler's Wells joined in collaboration with the Random Dance director Wayne McGregor. The 10th-anniversary piece Nemesis ran until 2001.

When Ian Albery retired as chief executive in October 2002 he was succeeded by Jean Luc Choplin, who had recently worked for Disneyland in Paris and Los Angeles and at one time worked with Rudolf Nureyev as a managing director of the Paris Opera Ballet. Although his contract ran until 2007, in January 2004 Choplin announced that he would be taking up a post at the Théâtre du Châtelet, Paris in 2006 and left shortly afterwards.

Under the artistic directorship of Alistair Spalding since 2004, Sadler's Wells has expanded to become a production house as well as a receiving house, hosting performances by visiting companies from the UK and around the world. In 2013, Sadler's Wells Dance House, a book by Sarah Crompton (Arts Editor in Chief of the Daily Telegraph) was published by Oberon Books. It covers the period 2005–2013 in the theatre's history.

To reflect this new ethos, in 2005 Spalding announced five associate artists, creating opportunities for them to work alongside each other and other collaborators in developing new work. The original five artists were BalletBoyz Michael Nunn and William Trevitt, Matthew Bourne's New Adventures, Akram Khan, Jonzi D and Wayne McGregor. A further eleven artists were announced, bringing the total of Associates to sixteen: Russell Maliphant (2005), Sylvie Guillem (2006), Jasmin Vardimon (2006), Christopher Wheeldon (2007), Sidi Larbi Cherkaoui (2008), Hofesh Shechter (2008), Michael Hulls (2010), Kate Prince (2010), Nitin Sawhney (2010), Michael Keegan-Dolan (2012) and Crystal Pite (2013).

Breakin' Convention, the International Festival of hip hop dance theatre has been produced annually by Sadler's Wells since 2004.

zero degrees, a collaboration between dance artists Akram Khan and Sidi Larbi Cherkaoui, visual artist Antony Gormley and composer Nitin Sawhney and PUSH, a programme of work made by Russell Maliphant for himself and Sylvie Guillem, are two of the award-winning productions to emerge from the new Sadler's Wells.

In March 2009, Sadler's Wells launched the Global Dance Contest—an online competition to find new dance talent from around the world. The competition will run for four years, with a winner receiving a cash prize and the chance to perform at Sadler's Wells Sampled, the taster weekend which each January showcases the huge range of dance to be seen throughout the year at the theatre. The first winner was Shu-Yi Chou, a 26-year-old choreographer from Taiwan. His work [1875] Ravel and Bolero was performed at Sadler's Wells on 30 and 31 January 2010. UK based James Wilton won the competition in 2011 with The Shortest Day. In 2012 the Swiss-based British choreographer Ihsan Rustem was the winner with State of Matter. In 2015, Sadler's Wells coproduced the show Triptyque with the Montreal-based collective The 7 Fingers.

Archives
The Islington Local History Centre holds the archive of Sadler's Wells Theatre, with material dating from 1712 onwards.

References

Sources
 Arundell, Dennis Drew, The Story of Sadler's Wells, 1683–1977, David and Charles, Newton Abbott, 1978. 
 Crompton, Sarah, Sadler's Wells Dance House, (Oberon Books, 2013) 
 Dent, Edward J., A Theatre for Everybody: The Story of The Old Vic and Sadler's Wells, London: 1945.
 Earl, John and Sell, Michael Guide to British Theatres 1750–1950, pp. 116–7 (Theatres Trust, 2000)

External links

Sadlers Wells website
Sadlers Wells History
Sadler's Wells on the Theatres Trust website
 Sadler's Wells at Google Cultural Institute
Douglas Craig – Daily Telegraph obituary
Sadler's Wells Theatre Archive, c1712-2012
 
 Independentopera at Sadler's Wells

Dance in London
Contemporary dance
Dance venues in England
1683 establishments in England
Theatres completed in 1998
Music venues completed in 1998
Grade II listed buildings in the London Borough of Islington
Grade II listed theatres
Theatres in the London Borough of Islington
Opera houses in England
Pleasure gardens in England
Ballet venues in the United Kingdom
The Royal Ballet
Birmingham Royal Ballet